eegee's (stylized eegee's) is a chain of 33+ restaurants in greater Tucson, Arizona, greater Phoenix, Arizona, and one location in Casa Grande, Arizona.  It specializes in submarine sandwiches and is known for its frozen fruit drink, called the "eegee."  It is also known for its signature ranch dressing, which come in several flavor variations. Chicken tenders were added to the menu in 2022. It was founded in 1971 by Edmund Irving and Robert Greenberg, who combined their initials ("E" from Edmund and "G" from Greenberg) to create the name "eegee's."  The company is known for its social and environmental involvement and financial contributions to initiatives, as well as the collection of donations for local charitable organizations; instituting the community recycling program 'Green for Green!'; and its program for training and employing the mentally disabled.

History

In 1971, Edmund Irving and Robert Greenberg pooled their resources and bought a used vending truck. In the beginning, Ed or Bob served their lemon eegee's frozen drink in front of high schools, at sporting events, and at concerts. Over the years, the vending trucks were retired as they turned their business into a growing restaurant chain in Southern Arizona.  Currently, there are 26 locations in the greater Tucson area, 5 locations in the greater Phoenix area, one location in Casa Grande, and one in Green Valley.

Flavor of the Month 
Lemon, Strawberry, Pina Colada, and Skinny Berry eegees are available all year but there is also a featured Flavor of the Month that changes each month of the year. There have also been special limited release flavors in addition to that month's flavor. These flavors include:

 Watermelon
 Peach 'n' Berry
 Cherry limeade
 Orange Dream
 Raspberry Lemonade
 Pineapple Dream
 Lucky Lime
 Mango Tango
 Jungle Juice
 Cherry Cider
 Holly Berry
 Black Raspberry/Scary Berry
 Blueberry Lemon
 Red Licorice
 Kiwi
 Prickly Pear
 Rootin' Tootin' Root Beer/Rodeo Root Beer
 Pineapple Watermelon Splash
 Banana Blush
 Pomegranite Blast
 Cherry Pineapple
 Galactic Grape
 Paradise Punch

External links
 Official Website
"Evolution of eegee's" from Tucson Weekly
Article on eegee's recycling practices

References

Fast-food chains of the United States
Regional restaurant chains in the United States
Companies based in Tucson, Arizona
Restaurants established in 1971
1971 establishments in Arizona